Alexandre Mars is a French entrepreneur, philanthropist and author.

Entrepreneurship 
In 1992, at the age of 17 and while still in high school,  Alexandre Mars started his first venture organizing concerts. The money he earned allowed him to launch A2X, one of the first French web agencies, along with a friend when he was 22. He sold the company in 1998 and launched his venture capital firm.

In 2002, Mars created Phonevalley, a mobile advertising and marketing agency that he sold to Publicis in 2007.

In 2006, he started ScrOOn, a platform specialized in social media that he sold to Blackberry in 2013.

Philanthropic activities
In 2014, he created the non-profit Epic Foundation, which selects and funds organizations that fight childhood and youth inequality in areas like education, health, safety and social and professional reinsertion. The foundation develops giving solutions for companies and individuals. Its operational costs are entirely financed by Mars to the amount of more than $2 million annually, thanks to the revenues generated by his venture capital firm blisce/, which invests in startups like Spotify and Pinterest.

Awards and honors 
In 2015, Alexandre Mars was named among the “Top 20 Philanthropists Under 40” by The New York Observer.

As President of the Commission for Sports and Society during Paris’s olympic bid, Alexandre Mars was chosen in 2018 by Tony Estanguet, head of the 2024 Olympics & Paralympic Games, to serve as a board member and ambassador.

Personal information
Alexandre Mars is married and has four children.

Notable works 
 OSE : TOUT LE MONDE PEUT DEVENIR ENTREPRENEUR, FLAMMARION, 2020
 Giving: Purpose is the New Currency, HarperOne/HarperCollins, 2019
 La Révolution du partage, Flammarion, 2018

References

External links
 Epic Foundation website

Living people
French philanthropists
People from Boulogne-Billancourt
HEC Paris alumni
Paris Dauphine University alumni
French company founders
Chevaliers of the Légion d'honneur
Year of birth missing (living people)